Tilothu, also spelled Tilauthu or Tilothu, is a village and corresponding community development block in Rohtas district, Bihar, India. It is located 15 km from Dehri-on-Sone on the west bank of the Son River. As of 2011, the population of Tilouthu was 16,402, in 2,745 families, while the corresponding block population was 109,249.

The census town of Saraiya is located within Tilouthu block, immediately south of the village of Tilouthu. Kaimur pahari stands erect in the west of the city whereas the river Sone blesses the farmers with its water in the east.

Tilothu cattle fair is considered to be the largest cattle fair in the state. This town is well connected by road to an important junction Dehri-on-Sone. This city is very popular among nearby villages as a place of worship of Lord Shiva.

It may be developed as a tourist place. A waterfall is located at the far end of this small city. It has religious importance i.e. one of Maa Shakti's forms in form of a cave is located alongside the waterfall. The waterfall is a hot spot of picnic for people from the near villages. The negligence attitude and the fear of naxalites hinders the required exposure to this place.

History 
This city got its name from Lord Tileshwarnath, a form of Lord Shiva. It was ruled over by Raja Shahmal before independence whose fort still refresh the reminiscences of its owner.

There are many historical places which are of interest to tourists. The Radhe Krishna temple is more than 350 years old. It is situated on the holy bank of the river Sone. This temple was created by Raja Shahmal and it seem to be to most prestigious places in that time.

Demographics 
Tilouthu block is a primarily rural district, apart from the urban town of Saraiya. The block population increased from 90,210 in 2001 to 109,249 in 2011, with 8,260 urban and 100,989 rural.

Sex ratio 
The sex ratio of Tilouthu block was 911 in 2011: 913 in rural areas and 885 in urban ones. These were all somewhat lower than the district averages. In rural areas, the ratio was higher among the 0-6 age group at 935, which was slightly above the district rural average of 933, while the urban 0-6 ratio was lower at 870, lowest among urban areas in Rohtas district. The overall sex ratio for the block among the 0-6 age group was 930, compared to the district average of 930.

Literacy 
The literacy rate of Tilouthu block was 70.99% in 2011, which was slightly below the district average of 73.37%. Literacy was higher in rural areas (71.21%) than urban ones (68.37%). Literacy was also higher among men than women, with 80.77% of men but only 60.18% of women able to read and write. The corresponding 20.55% gender literacy gap was slightly above average (19.91%) for Rohtas district.

Amenities 
37 of the 57 villages in Tilouthu block have medical facilities, serving 81.98% of the population, the highest proportion among sub-districts in Rohtas. 28 villages have telephone service, serving 68.84% of the population, 45 have permanent pucca roads, and 51 have access to electricity, serving 97.16% of the population. 9 villages have banks and agricultural credit societies, serving 45.84% of the block's population.

Education 
The village of Tilauthu contains 6 pre-primary schools, 5 primary schools, 2 middle schools, and 1 secondary school.

For primary education, a lot of government supported and private schools are there, where one can get education in Hindi medium as well as English. A few of the famous schools are Sarswati Shishu Mandir, Amaltas Niketan and Tilouthu High School. For higher education, there is one undergrad college, Radha Shanta College. Nearest villages Babuganj, Saraiya, Mirasarai, Maharajganj, etc.

At the block level, 44 of the 57 inhabited villages have schools, serving 95.08% of the population.

Villages 
There are a total of 65 villages in Tilouthu block, 57 inhabited and 8 uninhabited:

References

Cities and towns in Rohtas district